Science and technology in Canada consists of three distinct but closely related phenomena:
 the diffusion of technology in Canada
 scientific research in Canada
 innovation, invention and industrial research in Canada
In 2018, Canada spent approximately C$34.5 billion on domestic research and development, of which around $2 billion was spent directly by the federal government in-house and an additional $5.7 billion was provided by provincial and federal sources in the form of grants. This investment corresponds to about 1.57% of Canada's gross domestic product, a decline from 1.72% in 2014.
Canada was ranked 16th in the Global Innovation Index in 2022.

, the country has produced fifteen Nobel laureates in physics, chemistry, and medicine, and was ranked fourth worldwide for scientific research quality in a major 2012 survey of international scientists. It is furthermore home to the headquarters of a number of global technology firms. Canada has one of the highest levels of Internet access in the world, with over 33 million users, equivalent to around 94 percent of its total 2014 population.

Some of the most notable scientific developments in Canada include the creation of the modern alkaline battery and the polio vaccine and discoveries about the interior structure of the atomic nucleus. Other major Canadian scientific contributions include the artificial cardiac pacemaker, mapping the visual cortex, the development of the electron microscope, plate tectonics, deep learning, multi-touch technology and the identification of the first black hole, Cygnus X-1. Canada has a long history of discovery in genetics, which include stem cells, site-directed mutagenesis, T-cell receptor and the identification of the genes that cause Fanconi anemia, cystic fibrosis and early-onset Alzheimer's disease, among numerous other diseases.

The Canadian Space Agency operates a highly active space program, conducting deep-space, planetary, and aviation research, and developing rockets and satellites. Canada was the third country to design and construct a satellite after the Soviet Union and the United States, with the 1962 Alouette 1 launch. Canada is a participant in the International Space Station (ISS), and is a pioneer in space robotics, having constructed the Canadarm, Canadarm2 and Dextre robotic manipulators for the ISS and NASA's Space Shuttle. Since the 1960s, Canada's aerospace industry has designed and built numerous marques of satellite, including Radarsat-1 and 2, ISIS and MOST. Canada has also produced one of the world's most successful and widely used sounding rockets, the Black Brant; over 1,000 Black Brants have been launched since the rocket's introduction in 1961.

The diffusion of technology in Canada

Scientific research in Canada

Innovation, invention, and industrial research in Canada

Technological and industrial history of Canada

See also

 Canadian government scientific research organizations
 Canadian university scientific research organizations
 Canadian industrial research and development organizations
 Canadian scientists
 Canadian inventions
 Canadian space program
 Canada Institute for Scientific and Technical Information
 U15 - research-intensive universities
 Natural scientific research in Canada
 National Research Council (Canada)
 Nuclear power in Canada
 Open access in Canada
 Petroleum production in Canada
 Electricity sector in Canada
 Economic history of Canada

References

Further reading

External links

 Science and Technology for Canadians - Government of Canada
 Canada Science and Technology Museum - Government of Canada
 Canadian Institute for Advanced Research: Science
 Canadian Encyclopedia: Science
 The Society for the Preservation of Canada's Nuclear Heritage, Inc.